Toll Resources & Government Logistics (TRGL) is a division of the Toll Group. Predominantly, the division offers integrated logistics solutions to the oil and gas, mining, chemicals and coal industries in over 10 countries.

Divisions
Toll Offshore Petroleum Services is the owner-operator of offshore supply bases at Loyang in Singapore, Sihanoukville in Cambodia, and Sattahip in Thailand. Toll Offshore Petroleum Services supports onshore and offshore oil and gas exploration, development and production activities in the Asia-Pacific region from China in the north to Australia and Papua New Guinea in the South, as well as the Caspian Sea region.

Toll Marine Logistics (Australia) services include remote area stevedoring, shipping and marine logistics linking northern Australia to the Asia Pacific region. It also provides integrated supply chain management including intermodal services.  It employs about 300 people and has strong links within the Asia Pacific sphere.  Toll Marine Logistics (Asia) offers customised solutions for bulk handling and transportation of coal, steel scrap, billets, iron ores and pellets, and sand and aggregates.  Its service extend to entities in Indonesia, Malaysia, Cambodia, Vietnam, Philippines, Thailand and Myanmar.

Toll Energy is the largest provider of specialised integrated logistics services to the Australian oil and gas exploration, construction, and production industry. It has a network of supply bases located in the North West Shelf, Timor Sea, Bass Strait, Adelaide, Browse Basin, Cooper Basin, Brisbane, Singapore, Cambodia and Thailand.

Toll Mining Services provides customised supply chain services to the mining, chemical, petroleum and energy sectors.  They also specialise in inbound and outbound dangerous goods and chemical logistics for the hard rock and coal mining industries. Its services include bulk haulage of commodities such as coal, zinc, lead, iron ore, crude oil, petrol and salt; on and off haulage services including those with high payloads; fuel management and transport; transport of specialised bulk such as security sensitive ammonium nitrate and its storage and management; logistics for explosives; and inbound industrial chemical logistics.

Toll Remote Logistics provides services to military, naval and peace-keeping forces; entities within the mining sector and other commercial and not for profit organisations situated in remote locations. It delivers over 5 million litres of diesel and aviation fuels to a wide range of operational locations each month around the several countries.

Toll Liquids specialises in the transportation of bulk liquids and industrial gases by road for both dangerous goods and non-dangerous goods including food.

Toll Transitions provides removal and relocation services to about 300 Australian organizations and government departments. On average Toll Transitions manages about 30,000 relocations each year.

Capabilities
The $325 million upgrade of the Toll Offshore Petroleum Services facility in Loyang, Singapore, means that the firm owns one of the three major oil and gas hubs in the world. This facility operates on a 24/7 basis and has a berthing length of 1,000 metres and a water depth of 8.5 metres.  It  can accommodate more than 11 vessels at once, including large vessels such as drill ships. 
It  has a multi-storey ramp-up warehouse that has designated areas for the safe storage of dangerous goods. Toll Energy provides warehousing and open storage and offshore warehouse management.  For dangerous goods specifically, transport and storage is provided in purpose built facilities designed in conjunction with clients.  Toll Mining Services has warehousing including security sensitive ammonium nitrate storage facilities.  Toll Remote Logistics provides warehousing and fuel bunkering, storage and distribution.

As at June 2012 Toll Marine Logistics (Australia) had a fleet of 10 vessels including landing craft and container vessels. Toll Marine Logistics (Asia) had a fleet of over 80 vessels including tugs; dumb, self-propelled and discharging barges; landing craft; floating cranes, a floating terminal and a floating workshop and maintenance facility; and container vessels.  Toll Marine Logistics operates six terminals in Australia and two facilities located in Singapore and Indonesia.  Toll Mining Services has a fleet that can take payload tasks of up to 360 tonnes using powered trailer combinations.  The fleet can also transport security sensitive ammonium nitrate and explosives.

On average Toll Transitions manages about 30,000 relocations each year. In July 2010 Toll Transitions commenced its contract with the Australian Defence Force to provide both removal and relocation services which was reported to be more than $1 billion for the first five years. The Minister indicated in January 2012 that Defence usually relocates around 23,000 members and their families each year as part of the military posting cycle.

History
Toll Energy support on and offshore oil and gas production and exploration.

Toll Mining Services is involved in the logistics of dangerous goods and chemicals.  Toll Remote Logistics provides logistics support to military, naval and peace-keeping forces.

In April 2014 Toll Energy announced they would be constructing and operating a base in Darwin to support INPEX's Liquefied Natural Gas (LNG) off shore facilities in Ichthys Field in the Browse Basin.

See also
Toll Group
Toll Domestic Forwarding

References

Resources and Government Logistics
Logistics companies of Australia
Petroleum industry
Energy in Western Australia
Humanitarian aid